The NY Gridlock is a professional women's ultimate team based in New York City which competes in the Premier Ultimate League (PUL). The team joined the PUL for the league's inaugural 2019 season. Their stated mission is "to achieve competitive excellence on the field and equity in the sport of ultimate by increasing accessibility to and visibility of womxn  ultimate players."

Franchise history 
NY Gridlock Ultimate (NYGL) formed in early 2019, and is one of the original eight teams in the Premier Ultimate League. Their name is presumably a nod to the rush-hour traffic that's a common occurrence in their city.  

The team would have played its second season in 2020, but the PUL cancelled the season due to the COVID-19 pandemic.

Record 
In their 2019 season, NYGL defeated the Indianapolis Red 14–9, the Columbus Pride 17–10, the Austin Torch 14–12, and the Atlanta Soul 21–17. They fell to the Raleigh Radiance 20–11. This record gave them a third-place finish in the league. In the league semifinals, NYGL again fell to the Raleigh Radiance, 19–18.

Current coaching staff 

 Coach - Ryan Thompson (he/him/his)
 Coach - Eileen Murray (she/her/hers)
 Coach - Martha Gregory (she/her/hers)

Roster
The team's 2020 roster was as follows:

Social justice and equity 
In 2020, the Gridlock raised over $10,000 for the National Bail Out collective, a Black-led and Black-centered collective of abolitionist organizers, lawyers and activists building a community-based movement to end systems of pretrial detention and ultimately mass incarceration. Social justice and equity are built into their mission statement, with text that centers gender and racial equity and accountability in community partnerships. These were elaborated further by Eileen Murray, owner and General Manager, and Khunsa Amin, Director of Community, Outreach, and Operations in an interview with Still Out of Your League.

References

External links 

Premier Ultimate League teams
Ultimate (sport) teams
Ultimate teams established in 2019
2019 establishments in New York City